Rockland County's Best Magazine is a regional business publication that covers Rockland County, NY, and is published by BLM Publishing, a local book and magazine publisher noted for its hyper-local focus.

References

External links
 Official website
 Seikk Magazine

Business magazines published in the United States
Quarterly magazines published in the United States
Local interest magazines published in the United States
Magazines established in 2008
Magazines published in New York (state)
Rockland County, New York